KK Rabotnički is a basketball club based in Skopje, North Macedonia. They currently play in the Macedonian First League and ABA League Second Division. The club has won the Macedonian championship 15 times and the Macedonian Cup 10 times.

Fans of KK Rabotnički are known as City Park Boys or simply The Boys , the reds or the mighty reds.

History
The club was founded in 1946 in Skopje. In 1964, KK Rabotnički became a member of the first federal "A" league in the former Federation of six republics Yugoslavia and competed there on a regular basis until 1990. In the 1991–92 season, the team played in the Federal YUBA Liga. They have never won a Federal championship but they were finalists in the Federal Yugoslav Cup on two occasions in 1976 and 1983. Since the Macedonian Republic League became the new Macedonian First League, Rabotnički have been the most successful Macedonian basketball team of all time, winning a record 15 league titles and 9 national cups.

Honours

Domestic competitions   
Macedonian Republic League 
 Winners (9):  1948, 1949, 1950, 1951, 1952, 1960, 1961, 1963, 1964
Macedonian Republic Cup
 Winners (4): 1976, 1983, 1985, 1988
Macedonian League
 Winners (15): 1993, 1994, 1995, 1996, 1997, 1998, 1999, 2001, 2002, 2003, 2004, 2005, 2006, 2009, 2018
Macedonian Cup
 Winners (10): 1993, 1994, 1998, 2003, 2004, 2005, 2006, 2011, 2015, 2019
Macedonian Super Cup Winner
 Winners (2): 2001, 2011

European achievements  
FIBA Saporta Cup
 Semi-finalist (1): 1975–76
FIBA Europe Conference South
 Runners-up (1): 2003–04
Balkan International Basketball League
 Runners-up (1): 2008–09

Players

Roster 2022-2023

Depth chart

Retired numbers

KK Rabotnicki in European competitions
In their rich European history KK Rabotnicki competed in many European competitions. Their most successful period was in the 1990s. They competed for eleven seasons in four different cups.

BIBL League Seasons 
 2009: (7-5) 2nd 
 2010: (3-7) 9th

Seasons and results of Rabotnicki in Europe:

1975 FIBA European Cup

1993 Saporta Cup

1995 FIBA European League

1995 Europe Champions Cup

1996 FIBA Saporta Cup

1997 FIBA Saporta Cup

1999 FIBA Saporta Cup

2000 Radivoj Korać Cup

2002 FIBA Euro Challenge

2003 FIBA Euro Challenge – South Conference

2004 FIBA Euro Challenge

2017 FIBA Europe Cup

Rivalries
KK Rabotnički Skopje's fiercest and long standing city rival is MZT Skopje, the other large and popular basketball club in Macedonia. They also have supporters in the capital city. The rivalry started after the Independence of Macedonia, and the matches between these rivals have been labeled as the Eternal derby.

Notable players

  Goran Veselinovski
  Toni Simić
  Gjorgji Čekovski
  Goran Samardžiev
  Dime Tasovski
  Aleksandar Dimitrovski
  Pero Blazevski
  Ognen Stojanovski
  Pero Antić
  Bojan Trajkovski
  Dimitar Mirakovski
  Aleksandar Kostoski
  Dušan Bocevski
  Jordančo Davitkov
  Gjorgji Knjazev
  Dejan Jovanovski
  Mirza Kurtović
  Todor Gečevski
  Srdjan Stanković
  Marjan Gjurov
  Riste Stefanov
  Goce Gerasimovski
  Vlatko Vladičevski
  Vrbica Stefanov
  Darko Sokolov
  Budimir Jolović
  Emil Rajković
  Dimitar Karadžovski
  Vlado Ilievski
  Toni Grnčarov
  Vasko Najkov
  Marjan Srbinovski
  Jane Petrovski
  Marko Simonovski
  Aleksandar Ugrinoski
  Eftim Bogoev
  Boris Nešović
  Đorđe Vojnović
  Goran Dimitrijević
  Enes Hadžibulić
  Ivica Dimčevski
  Bojan Krstevski
  Kiril Nikolovski
  Boban Stajić
  Marko Ivanović
  Zoran Jovanović
  Dragoljub Vidačić
  Dragan Smiljanić
  Vladimir Dragutinović
  Vladimir Filipović
  Miljan Pavković
  Vladimir Popović
  Srdjan Božić
  Predrag Joksimović
  Kendrick Johnson
  Marcus Ginyard
  Russell Robinson
  Sean Evans
  Paul Culbertson
  Antoni Wyche
  William Coleman
  Phil Zevenbergen
  Hameed Kashif
  Gary Ware
  Vernand Hollins
  Vincent King
  Igor Bijelić
  Danilo Mitrović
  Stojan Ivković
  Luka Pavićević
  Mohamed Abukar
  Goran Ikonić
  Bariša Krasić
  Bora Paçun 
  Rudy Mbemba
  William Njoku
  Chavdar Kostov
  Lazar Lečić
  Predrag Bogosavljev
  Nikola Matovski
  Slavko Matovski
  Blagoja Georgievski
  Janko Lukovski
  Stefan Todorovski
  Slobodan Bocevski
  Aleksandar Knjazev
  Dragan Radosavljević
  Steruli Andonovski
  Stevan Gešovski
  Boban Samardžiski
  Branko Kacarski
  Kosta Hadžitrifunov
  Borče Serafimovski

Head coaches

 Marin Dokuzovski 
 Steruli Andonovski
 Aleksandar Knjazev 
 Tihomir Matevski 
 Marjan Lazovski
 Lazar Lečić 
 Emil Rajković
 Marjan Srbinovski
 Goran Krstevski
 Igor Gacov

References

External links
Official Website

Team info at MKF
Eurobasket.com KK Rabotnicki Page
Supporters Website

Basketball teams in North Macedonia
Basketball teams in Yugoslavia
Sport in Skopje